The 2014 Big 12 Conference football season was the 19th season of college football player for the Big 12 Conference.  It was part of the 2014 NCAA Division I FBS football season.

Preseason

Big 12 Media Preseason Poll

() first place votes

Preseason All-Big 12
2014 Pre-season Coaches All-Big 12

Offensive Player of the Year: Bryce Petty, Baylor, QB
Defensive Player of the Year: Devonte Fields, TCU, DL
Newcomer of the Year: Tyreek Hill, Oklahoma State, WR

Rankings

Head coaches
	

 Art Briles, Baylor	
 Paul Rhoads, Iowa State	
 Clint Bowen, Kansas interim
 Bill Snyder, Kansas State	
 Bob Stoops, Oklahoma	
	
 Mike Gundy, Oklahoma State
 Gary Patterson, TCU
 Charlie Strong, Texas
 Kliff Kingsbury, Texas Tech	
 Dana Holgorsen, West Virginia

Schedule

Week one

Week two

Week three

Week four

Week five

Week six

Week seven

Week eight

Week nine

Week ten

Week eleven

Week twelve

Week thirteen

Week fourteen

Week fifteen

Bowl games

Home game attendance

All-Big 12 Teams

The 2014 Coaches All-Big 12 team. Selections are made by the league's 10 head coaches, who are not permitted to vote for their own players.

Individual Honors
 Chuck Neinas Coach of the Year: Gary Patterson, TCU
 Offensive Player of the Year: Trevone Boykin, TCU, QB
 Defensive Player of the Year: Paul Dawson, TCU, LB
 Offensive Newcomer of the Year: Tyreek Hill, Oklahoma State, ATH
 Defensive Newcomer of the Year: Shaq Riddick, West Virginia, DL
 Offensive Freshman of the Year: Samaje Perine, Oklahoma, RB
 Defensive Freshman of the Year: Kamari Cotton-Moya, Iowa State, DB
 Special Teams Player of the Year: Tyler Lockett, Kansas State, KR/PR
 Co-Offensive Linemen of the Year: Spencer Drango, Baylor, OL & B. J. Finney, Kansas State, OL
 Defensive Lineman of the Year: Emmanuel Ogbah, Oklahoma State, DL

First Team Offense

First Team Defense

First Team Special Teams

Second Team Offense

Second Team Defense

Second Team Special Teams

References